Devil's Bride is the first Lithuanian musical created in 1974 and based on the book by Kazys Boruta Baltaragio malūnas. Due to its popularity it is sometimes called a Lithuanian Jesus Christ Superstar rock opera. This musical is a joint creation by the director Arūnas Žebriūnas, composer Vyacheslav Ganelin and scriptwriter Sigitas Geda.

Synopsis
A devil, Pinčiukas (Gediminas Girvainis), comes to earth and lands near the mill of Baltaragis (Vasilijus Simčičius). Pinčiukas and Baltaragis conclude a pact: the devil will help the miller in his work and will get him a spectacular wife, Marcelė (Vaiva Mainelytė). In exchange, Baltaragis will let Pinčiukas marry the beautiful daughter he and Marcelė will have. Soon after giving birth to a daughter, Marcelė dies. The daughter, Jurga (played by the same actress interpreting her mother, Vaiva Mainelytė), grows up to become a beautiful woman, and the handsome Girdvainis (Regimantas Adomaitis) falls in love with her. Pinčiukas plays all sort of tricks to separate Jurga from Girdvainis, while Baltaragis regrets his pact with the devil and tries to persuade him to marry instead his not-so-beautiful sister Uršulė (Regina Varnaitė). In the end, the whole village realizes Pinčiukas is a devil and tries to kill him by drowning him in a nearby river, but he is saved by Uršulė, who is secretly in love with him. In the final scene, Jurga is happily riding with Girdvainis, and they pass by Uršulė and Pinčiukas, who also seem happy with their children.

Cast
Vaiva Mainelytė – Jurga and Marcelė
Regimantas Adomaitis – Girdvainis
Gediminas Girdvainis – Pinčiukas
Vasilijus Simčičius – Baltaragis
Regina Varnaitė – Uršulė
Bronius Babkauskas
Juozas Meškauskas
Regina Arbačiauskaitė
Danutė Krištopaitytė
Jonas Pakulis – The Almighty

Reception
Velnio nuotaka was one of the most successful and celebrated movies in the Lithuanian cinema of the Soviet era. Critics have noted influences of Russian movies, but have also praised the originality of “the set and camera movement” that made Arūnas Žebriūnas's style somewhat unique. An “historical Lithuanian movie,” it was also influenced by the “devilish” 1970s, as evidenced by “its portrait of a quite licentious Satanic kingdom on earth.”

References

External links 
 

1974 films
1970s musical films
Lithuanian drama films
Soviet-era Lithuanian films
Soviet musical drama films
Films based on Lithuanian novels